Tebenna onustana is a moth of the family Choreutidae. It is known from Ontario, Quebec and the north-eastern part of the United States.

The forewings are brownish-gray with broad white antemedial and postmedial lines. The antemedial line is almost straight, while the postmedial line is arc-shaped or almost V-shaped. There are two blackish patches inside the postmedial line, and one blackish patch beyond the postmedial line. The hindwing is brownish-gray with scattered white scales near the center. The top of the thorax is brownish with three thin white longitudinal lines. The top of the head is light brown or tan.

References

External links
mothphotographersgroup

Tebenna
Moths described in 1864